The Scottish Further and Higher Education Association (SFHEA) is a trade union for lecturers employed in the further and higher education sectors.

History
It was established as the Scottish Further Education Association (SFEA) in 1966, it changed its name in 1983.

References

Educational organisations based in Scotland
Higher education in Scotland
Higher education organisations based in the United Kingdom
Organisations based in Glasgow
Trade unions in Scotland

Trade unions established in 1966